Theodore J. Kosens (October 3, 1941 – December 4, 2004) was an American football defensive back. He played for the Minnesota Vikings in 1963.

He died on December 4, 2004, in Brightwaters, New York at age 63.

References

1941 births
2004 deaths
Players of American football from New York City
American football defensive backs
Hofstra Pride football players
Minnesota Vikings players
Chaminade High School alumni